Zuikov or Zuykov is a Russian masculine surname, its feminine counterpart is Zuikova or Zuykova. It may refer to
Sergei Zuykov (born 1993), Russian football defender
Viktor Zuikov (born 1962), Estonian fencer

Russian-language surnames